Pseudoheterolebes is a genus of trematodes in the family Opecoelidae. After having been originally described, it was largely ignored by other scientists due to the originally vague definition of the genus; Martin et al., 2018 resurrected the genus to resolve a dispute among the existing definitions of Opistholebes and Maculifer, which were also described by earlier reports of Yamaguti.

Species
Pseudoheterolebes adcotylophorus (Manter, 1947) Martin, Ribu, Cutmore & Cribb, 2018
Pseudoheterolebes corazonae Martin, Ribu, Cutmore & Cribb, 2018
 Pseudoheterolebes cotylophorus (Ozaki, 1935) Yamaguti, 1959
Pseudoheterolebes diodontis (Cable, 1956) Martin, Ribu, Cutmore & Cribb, 2018
Pseudoheterolebes stellaglobulus Martin, Ribu, Cutmore & Cribb, 2018

References

Opecoelidae
Plagiorchiida genera